Lady Andal Venkatasubba Rao School, popularly known as Lady Andal, is an academic institution in Harrington road, Chennai in Tamil Nadu, India. It is a unit of the Madras Seva Sadan, established in 1987. The school follows the Montessori philosophy. It is one of  the top schools in Chennai preferred by the city's most famous personalities from the political, entertainment and sports world making it one of the expensive day schools in the city.
It boasts a multicultural mix of students and follows the motto, "Service with a Smile".

Founders and history

Andalamma, was born in the year 1894. Since she came from a well-to-do family, she had the benefit of good education (something that many girls didn't have, in those days). She went to St. Thomas Convent, Mylapore and the Presidency High School, Egmore and learnt all the crafts and skills of a young lady of her time.

At a very young age, Andalamma became a widow and thought she must now accept a life of seclusion- for widows in those days could not remarry or mingle in society.It was then that she met the person who would change her life the Hon'ble Justice M. Venkatasubba Rao, a brilliant and much respected judge who was determined to make Andalamma his wife – abrave gesture in those times. Justice Venkatasubba Rao was a very special man - learned, courageous and upright in his beliefs. He deeply wished to transform the ills of society and in his young wife he found the ideal partner. Together, they set out to brighten the lives of hundreds of under-privileged people. 
Both of them believed in living by example-never to preach, but to practice their ideals, to show others by lighting the way.

In 1928, with their own money (a grand sum of Rs.10,000 which at that time was a generous figure indeed) they founded the Madras Seva Sadan - an institute to protect, teach and help  children and people who been abandoned and mistreated by society. Here on the sprawling grounds of this noble institution, all the ideals and love in the mind and heart of Lady Andal began to take shape.At the Madras Seva Sadan, women who thought they had nothing to live for found new purpose and meaning in life. They were fed and clothed, given work, taught skills and learnt to become happy, independent members of society. The numbers grew from 8 to 3,000 in just 30 years.So, the Madras Seva Sadan and all the many other institutions under it, grew from strength to strength under Lady Andal's firm and careful guidance. She didn't just lead her people, she took a personal interest in each one. Her stately presence was beloved by all. Dressed in beautiful silk sarees she would weave flowers into the hair of little girls, feed them personally with rice balls, take them for evening drives to the beach. (She was one of the first ladies to drive her own car in those old-fashioned times). When the holidays came and some children had no home to go to, she took them to her own beautiful house where they spent memorable times together.In fact, she was truly a mother to many, taking care of them until they were old enough to marry, finding good husbands for the girls, and organizing the weddings, for which she herself would buy the sarees and jewellery.

Lady Andal worked tirelessly to organize the many activities and functions of the Madras Seva Sadan. Breaking all barriers of caste, creed, religion and social stigma, the Madras Seva Sadan took in people from any and every background. In fact, once a Harijan girl joined the school, but the upper caste children did not want to eat with her. Lady Andal did not scold or lecture, but taught the children a lesson they would never forget. She invited all the children to eat with her. At the Meal, she seated the Harijan child on her right, with the other children all around them and then she began to eat. Once the others saw this, they realized how small and limited their thinking was. The problem never came up again.

To commemorate the name of the Founder, Lady Andal school was established in 1987. Today the school is situated inside the campus of the Madras Seva Sadan and is established as the unit of the same. The school is run as a self-financed private institution managed by the Trust Committee of the Madras Seva Sadan.

Administration
The school was run by the late Mrs. C. Prema Kumar, who was its correspondent principal. The principal is Mrs. Tamara Coelho, who took the place of the principal from Mrs. Shalini Pillay by the end of the academic year 2012–2013.

Campus
A concert hall, the Sir Mutha Venkata Subba Rao Hall, was built by 2006. The students are unofficially referred to as Andalites. Many important events like The Hindu International Music Festival, Show Stoppers Inc., U.S. Consulate General - Chicago Children's Choir, Littleshows award, The Wonder Years -An Arabian Nights.

Auditorium
Created as a memorial for the Founder, and for the preservation & propagation of Indian & all other forms of art & culture, the complex consists of an 1100 two level air-conditioned theatre with a  stage, a 200-seat open-air stage, a  multipurpose hall for exhibitions, workshops, seminars, etc., a reference library for performing arts, an art gallery and a coffee shop. Equipped with some of the most advanced audio-visual & lighting equipment, this complex is a one-stop shop which can cater to anything form a solo performance, a street play, to a philharmonic orchestra.

Houses
Ruby       
Emerald    
Sapphire   
Topaz     
Amethyst   
Turquiose

Notable alumni

Shruti Haasan, film actress

A. R. Ameen, playback singer

Megha Akash, film actress

Akshara Haasan, film actress

Jeevan Thondaman, politician
Regina Cassandra, film actress
Kalyani Priyadarshan, film actress

Deepika Pallikal, Squash player 

Lakshmi Shruti Settipalli, Indian Squash player

Uthara Unnikrishnan, Indian Playback singer
Shanmuga Pandian
Hemachandran (actor)
Shruthi Ramachandran

References

External links
 Official website
 Official website of Sir M. Venkata Subba Rao Matriculation Higher Secondary School, T.Nagar, Chennai - 17.

Montessori schools in India
Primary schools in Tamil Nadu
High schools and secondary schools in Tamil Nadu
Private schools in Chennai
Educational institutions established in 1987
1987 establishments in Tamil Nadu